INS Eilat (501) is a  of the Israeli Navy that was built by Northrop Grumman Ship Systems in 1993. She is one of three Sa'ar 5-class corvettes in service with the Israeli Navy and her homeport is Haifa, Israel. The contract for the construction of the three ships of the class was signed in the early 1980s. Eilat was the first of the three ships to be launched and commissioned, being the first in her class.

References

External links
Eilat Class Sa'ar 5 Multi-Mission Corvettes, Israel

Sa'ar 5-class corvettes
1993 ships
Ships built in Pascagoula, Mississippi